Reda Kateb (born 27 July 1977) is a French actor.

Life and career
Kateb was born in Ivry-sur-Seine, France, to an Algerian actor, Malek-Eddine Kateb, and a French nurse of Czech and Italian origin. He is a grandnephew of the Algerian writer Kateb Yacine. He grew up in Ivry-sur-Seine, in the Paris region, where he lived until 2011 before moving to Montreuil.

His short film Pitchoune was presented in the Directors' Fortnight section at the 2015 Cannes Film Festival.

Filmography

As actor

Film

Television series

As film director/screenwriter

Awards and nominations

See also
 Maghrebian community of Paris

References

External links 

 
 

1977 births
Living people
Male actors from Paris
French male film actors
French male television actors
French people of Algerian descent
French people of Czech descent
French people of Italian descent
People from Ivry-sur-Seine
21st-century French male actors
Chevaliers of the Ordre des Arts et des Lettres
Best Supporting Actor César Award winners
French film directors
French male screenwriters
French screenwriters
Algerian people of Italian descent
Algerian people of Czech descent